, born , is a Japanese freelance presenter, tarento, radio personality, narrator who is affiliated with Sony Music Artists. He is very popular in Japan having participated in various TV commercials, TV shows, among other Audio-visual-related activities. Kabira is well known in the West due to his narration in the Winning Eleven video game series. He comments alongside former ex-Japanese footballers Tsuyoshi Kitazawa and Hiroshi Nanami, in the past games he also comments alongside other ex-Japanese players like Yasutaro Matsuki, Kozo Tashima, Hiroshi Hayano and Tetsuo Nakanishi.

His younger brother  is also active as a media personality.

Filmography

Movies
 Pokémon: Destiny Deoxys (Gurū)
 Shrek 2 (Doris)
 Goal! (Martin Tyler)
 Shrek the Third (Doris)
 Pride (Soichiro Asami)
 Shrek Forever After (Doris)

TV
 Thomas & Friends (Narrator, 2008-2018)
 Chatty Jay's Sundry Shop (Host, 2016-2019)

Video games
Hakunetsu Pro Yakyuu Ganba League (Voice)
Winning Eleven series (Commentator)
Hyper Formation Soccer (Supervisor, Voice)

See also
Eigo de Shabera Night
J-League Jikkyō Winning Eleven 97
Pro Evolution Soccer 2010
Pro Evolution Soccer 2011

References

External links
Official website
Profile from Sony Music Artists

1958 births
Living people
Japanese people of American descent
People from Naha
Japanese male video game actors
Japanese male voice actors
Japanese television personalities
Japanese radio personalities
20th-century Japanese male actors
21st-century Japanese male actors